The following is a list of monarchs of the Jaffna kingdom from 1215 with the invasion of Kalinga Magha to the Portuguese conquest of Jaffna Kingdom under Cankili II 1619.

House of Kalinga Eastern Gangas (India) (1215–1255)

Tambralinga (1255–1277)

Aryacakravarti dynasty (1277–1450)

Kingdom of Kotte (1450–1467)

Aryacakravarti dynasty (restored) (1467–1619)

Portuguese Empire (1619-1624)

See also
 Jaffna kingdom
 History of Sri Lanka

Jaffna kingdom
Jaffna
Jaffna